Christianity is a major religion in Ogun State, where Sharia is not valid. The Roman Catholic Diocese of Ijebu-Ode and the Roman Catholic Diocese of Abeokuta are present in the state. Ijebu-Ode has a St. Clare’s Monastery. The international headquarters of the Church of the Lord (Aladura) are in Ogere-Remo, Ogun State. The Universal Church of the Kingdom of God is present in the state. 
In Ogun State, the Celestial Church of Christ has Alafia, Emi, Ibukun, Itunu, Itunu Iyanu, Iyanu, Oba Nla, Ogo Oluwa and Oluwaseun Parishes e. Christ Apostolic Church has churches in the state. Jubilee Christian Church International has its headquarters in Abeokuta. The Anglican church is present in Ogun State.
  The town of Ota has a tract of land known as Canaanland, which includes the church of the name Faith Tabernacle and Covenant University. Crawford University and Seventh-day Adventist Babcock University are present in the state. Western Diocese of Salem International Christian Centre has its seat in the state. The Redeemed Christian Church of God owns Redeemer's University.
Christ International Divinity College (CINDICO) has its seat in the state.

See also
Christianity in Kano State
Christianity in Sokoto State
Christianity in Borno State
Christianity in Jigawa State
Christianity in Kaduna State
Christianity in Katsina State
Christianity in Kebbi State
Christianity in Kwara State
Christianity in Niger State
Christianity in Adamawa State
Christianity in Osun State
Christianity in Yobe State

References

Ogun State
Ogun